Moores Creek Bridge is an historic single span reinforced concrete bridge located on North 2nd Street between Avenues B and C in Fort Pierce, Florida. Including run up, it is 46 feet long. It is known locally as the Tickle Tummy Bridge or Tickle Tummy Hill because of its high arch relative to its short length. On August 17, 2001, it was added to the U.S. National Register of Historic Places.

History 
In 1925 Moores Creek Bridge was built by the Luten Bridge Company of Palatka, Florida to connect a residential section of Fort Pierce to the downtown and waterfront districts. It replaced a previous wooden bridge and is one of 15 concrete arch bridges dating from Florida's early 20th century land-boom era.

The bridge was retrofitted in 1997 by the joint efforts of Fort Pierce Main Street, the City of Fort Pierce and the Florida Department of Transportation. It reopened on December 7, 1997.

References 

Fort Pierce, Florida
Luten bridges
Transportation buildings and structures in St. Lucie County, Florida
Bridges completed in 1925
Road bridges on the National Register of Historic Places in Florida
National Register of Historic Places in St. Lucie County, Florida
1925 establishments in Florida
Concrete bridges in the United States
Arch bridges in the United States